Larissa Franklin (born March 26, 1993) is a Canadian Olympic softball player.

Career
Franklin joined Team Canada in 2011, competing in the 2011 WBSC Junior Women's World Championship in Cape Town, South Africa, where her team finished fifth. After joining the senior team in 2013, Franklin competed in the World Cup of Softball and the WBSC Americas Qualifier, winning a silver medal with her team. Franklin has continued playing for Canada, competing in international events such as the 2014, 2016 and 2018 WBSC Women’s Softball World Championships, where she won bronze in the latter two events. In 2015, she and her team competed at the 2015 Pan American Games in Toronto, where they won gold, and in the 2019 Pan American Games in Lima, where they won silver. In June 2021, Franklin was named to Canada's 2020 Olympic team.

Personal life
Franklin is openly lesbian.

References

External links
 Purdue Fort Wayne Mastodons bio
 Western Kentucky Lady Toppers bio

1993 births
Living people
Canadian softball players
Competitors at the 2022 World Games
Softball players at the 2015 Pan American Games
Softball players at the 2019 Pan American Games
Medalists at the 2015 Pan American Games
Medalists at the 2019 Pan American Games
Pan American Games gold medalists for Canada
Pan American Games silver medalists for Canada
People from Maple Ridge, British Columbia
Purdue Fort Wayne Mastodons athletes
Western Kentucky Lady Toppers softball players
Softball players at the 2020 Summer Olympics
Olympic softball players of Canada
Medalists at the 2020 Summer Olympics
Olympic bronze medalists for Canada
Olympic medalists in softball
Canadian LGBT sportspeople
LGBT softball players
Pan American Games medalists in softball
21st-century Canadian women
21st-century Canadian LGBT people